The Wirngir are an Aboriginal Australian people of the Kimberley region of Western Australia.

Country
They were a coastal people, whose inland borders stopped in the highlands. They were present around Cape Bernier, as far southeast lower Lyne River and Vancouver Point.

Their neighbours were the Miriwung on their east and southeastern flank, the Arnga, south and southwest, and the Yeidji directly west of their northern boundary.

History of contact
The Wirngir, like other peoples in the area, were deeply affected by the Forrest River massacre, which accounted for the disarray of their social organizations, according to the anthropologist Phyllis Kaberry when she visited with the Lyne River peoples to study them in the mid-1930s.

Alternative names
 Wadaja
 Walar. (a putative name for their language)
 Winggir. (a name for Cape Dussejour)
 Wular, Wola

Notes

Citations

Sources

Aboriginal peoples of Western Australia